This is a list of football (soccer) clubs in Senegal.

For a complete list see :Category:Football clubs in Senegal

Key

A-C

B-C

D

E-G

H-L

M-P

P-R

S

T-Z

Former clubs

See also
Football in Senegal

Notes

  
Senegal
Football clubs in Senegal
Football clubs